Mimi-Isabella Cesar (born 28 January 1995) is a British individual rhythmic gymnast who has represented England and Great Britain at international competitions.

Career highlights
Cesar made her international debut for Great Britain at the 2011 World Rhythmic Gymnastics Championships in Montpellier, France finishing 112th in the individual all-around competition. She suffered an ankle injury in 2013 but recovered in time for 2014 Commonwealth Games in Glasgow in July where alongside Stephani Sherlock and Lynne Hutchison finished fourth the team all-around event. Two months late she competed at the 2014 Rhythmic Gymnastics World Championships in İzmir, Turkey finishing 22nd in teams event. Cesar placed 28th at the FIG Berlin Masters World Challenge Cup event in July 2017 before the contesting her second Commonwealth Games in 2018, failing again to reach the medal podium. Cesar is aiming to reach a third Commonwealth Games in her city of Birmingham in 2022 however she fears she will not be selected due to her age and accused British Gymnastics of ageism.

Personal life
Cesar attended Bishop Walsh Catholic School in Sutton Coldfield and in 2017, graduated from the University of Wolverhampton with a Bachelor in Sports Studies. She formerly taught physical education at Castle Bromwich Infant School.

References

External links
 

1995 births
Alumni of the University of Wolverhampton
British rhythmic gymnasts
Commonwealth Games competitors for England
English gymnasts
Gymnasts at the 2014 Commonwealth Games
Gymnasts at the 2018 Commonwealth Games
Living people
Sportspeople from Birmingham, West Midlands